The Sun Temple of Multan was a temple dedicated to Surya, the Hindu Sun God, in the city of Multan. It commanded significant fame in the subcontinent as a place of pilgrimage and wealth under Hindu as well as Islamic rule before being destroyed in the late tenth century. It appears to have been reconstructed, before being ruined.

The location of the temple remains unknown to historical certainty; however, it is distinct from the Prahladpuri Temple.

Hindu Legends 
The earliest extant Hindu text to mention of a solar cult is Samba Purana (c. 7th–8th century CE)—the associated legend made its way into the Bhavishya Purana and even a twelfth century inscription in Eastern India. 

After being cursed into a leper, Samba had urged Krishna to restore his youth, who noted of the Sun-God (Surya) alone to have had such abilities. So, acting upon the advice of Narada, Samba left for the forests of Mitravan on the banks of Chandrabhaga, which already served as the sacred lands of Surya. There, he propitiated Surya into appearing before himself and secured boons of cure and eternal fame. In return, Samba had to set up solar temples; Bhavishya Purana mentions that Surya had specifically instructed to be installed at the banks of Chandrabhaga, as His perpetual abode. The next day, Samba would receive an icon of Surya while bathing, and subsequently, the first Sun-temple was established in Sambapura.

Sambapura has been since identified with Multan—and the temple with the eponymous institution—but Heinrich von Stietencron disagrees. He notes that formerly, it was not the Chandrabhaga but Ravi that passed by Multan; the original town must be at some yet-undetermined site. Alternatively, the Puranic legend must be a recent interpolation.

History 
The antecedents of the temple remain unknown to historical certainty and André Wink speculates it to have borne Buddhist and Zoroastrian influences.

Hindu-Buddhist Rule 
During Hsuen Tsang's visit in 641 CE, it was the only solar temple in Sindh; for a comparison, Tsang had noted 299 Brahminical temples, a majority of which were of Saivite sect. He wrote:

Umayyad Conquest 
After the conquest of Sindh by the Umayyad Caliphate in 8th century CE under the leadership of Muhammad bin Qasim, Multan fell after a long siege and the Brahmin dynasty was replaced. Al-Biruni writes that the Sun Temple was spared after bin-Qasim came to know about its prominent role in the regional economy but a piece of cow-flesh was mockingly hang around the neck; a Sunni mosque was also commissioned. Al-Baladhuri's Futuh al-Buldan (c. mid-9th century CE) did not speak about any defilation or erection of mosque; he merely noted that all wealth—thirteen thousand and two hundred maunds of gold—were confiscated from what was the preeminent site of pilgrimage for local Sindhis, who used to shave their beards and head before circumambulating it and offering riches. 

Centuries later, even Ibn al-Jawzi—a noted polemicist against heretical practices (c. 13th century CE)—would note Qasim to have had spared the temple in lieu of rights to a third of its revenues. Pilgrims were apparently compelled to pay a sum between one hundred and ten thousand dirhams, adjudged according to their financial capacity: a third went to the Muslims per Qasim's agreement, another third went to the maintenance of city facilities, and the rest went to the priests. 'Ali al-Shatibi al-Maghribi's (fl.1465 CE) history of Arabia reproduces the same details except a third of revenue did not go to Muslims but to the poor. 

In Chach Nama—which purports to be the translation by `Ali Kufi (13th century) of an early eighth century Arabic text, but was probably an original effort—we have construction of the temple attributed to Jibawin, a devout Brahmin ruler who had supposedly buried enviable treasure underneath it; the idol was so lively that Qasim mistook it for a man, and he obtained thirteen thousand and two hundred mans of gold upon excavation. This gain of treasures—by loot or revenue—would lead to Multan being regarded as the "Frontiers of gold" by Arab geographers, well into the fourteenth century.

Arab Governors 
Multiple Muslim sources—from voyager-historians like Al-Istakhri, Al-Maqdisi, Al-Masudi, Ahmad ibn Rustah and Ibn Hawqal to encyclopedists like Ibn al-Nadim—note of the temple esp. in the late Abbasid phase. 

Istakhri (early 10th century CE) noted the temple to have been located in the most populous part of Multan between the city's ivory and copper-smith bazaars. The idol—wholly draped in red leather except for the eyes, studded with gems—was placed under the cupola and commanded pan-sectarian reverence. Adorning a crown of gold, it sat in a "quadrangular position" on a brick throne with fists in the gyan mudra, rested on knees. He also described how the temple was leveraged by the Muslim rulers as an indemnity against potential invasion by neighbouring Hindu powers. Al Masudi, a contemporary of Istakhri, reiterates this strategical use of the temple; besides, he notes the ritual offerings—consisting of money, precious stones, perfumes, and especially aloe-wood of Kumar—as the greatest contributor to state revenues. 

Ibn Hawqal, yet another contemporary, reproduced Istakhri's narrative in toto but supplanted some details from his own travels: all revenue were forfeited to the Amir who ensured that the priests had sufficient means. Rustah, yet another contemporary, found the temple to be a significant source of revenue especially with rich people dedicating their property to it. Al-Nadim's contemporaneous account in the encyclopedia, noted hordes of diseased people to be among its devotees who prayed for a quick recovery.

Overall, the temple continued to maintain its prominence under patronage by Muslim Governors, in what Finbarr B. Flood, an art-historian, dubs as a regime of "mercantile cosmopolitanism"; Y. Friedmann, a scholar of Islamic History, interprets the evidence to attest to the accordance of Hindus with the status of dhimmi. Despite, there appears to have been a total loss of financial autonomy when compared to the days immediately after the conquest.

Ismaili Emirs 
With the increasing influence of Fatimid Caliphate in the frontiers of Persia, arrived Jalam (var. Halam) in 959 CE, to replace the old Da'ai who had not only exhibited "reprehensible syncretism" by allowing neo-converts to maintain their traditional practices but also disputed the noble origins of Fatimids. Jalam took to preaching Isma'ilism aggressively and obtained success; he would have the ruling dynasty switch their allegiance from the Abbasids to Fatimids soon. 

About 965 CE, a letter from the Fatimid Caliph congratulated Jalam on destroying a (unknown) temple and constructing a mosque on the site. This has been understood by some to refer to the destruction of the Sun Temple, esp. in light of Al-Biruni explicitly holding Jalam responsible for the event and assassination of all priests, writing only a few decades hence. However, Maqdisi —a pro-Fatimid geographer— who had visited Multan c. 985 CE, reiterated Istakhri's observations about the Sun-Temple, including locational details. Maclean argues that had the site been transformed into an Ismaili mosque, Maqdisi would have found it worthy of mention; he rejects attempts to resolve this discrepancy by having the local Hindus reconstruct the temple in the intervening years since it would have involved demolition of the new mosque under Ismaili watch. Overall, it could not have been the Sun Temple which was mentioned in the letter and the Sun Temple was demolished only after Maqdisi's visit; such a demolition might have been a pattern or not depending on whether the letter was propaganda and whether Al-Biruni was accurate.

Al-Biruni, visiting the site in early 11th century, came across desolate ruins. Muhammad al-Idrisi's geographical compendium (mid-12th century CE) not only reproduced Istakhri's narrative in entirety but also added that the temple dome was gilded and that the idol — of unknown antiquity — had four arms; however, he had never visited Multan and in all likelihood, the novel additions were from earlier travelogues. Ibn al-Athir, who probably did not visit Multan either, deemed the idol to be of Job.

Late-Mughal and Colonial India 

Jean de Thévenot visiting Multan in 1666, under Aurzangzeb's rule (1658–1707), mentions a Hindu temple attracting pilgrims from far and wide, whose offerings contributed to the provincial exchequer – the description of the idol ran similar to Istakhri's though he claimed ignorance about the identity of deity. Thus, it appears that the temple was restored at an unknown time.  

Alexander Cunningham, visiting Multan in 1853, noted local tradition to blame Aurangzeb for destructing the temple though no inhabitant was able to identify the site; he was also told that the Sikhs, upon not finding a trace of the temple when Ranjit Singh had occupied the town in 1818, converted a venerated tomb to a Gurdwara. Deriving from etymological arguments, he reasoned the site of the recently-destructed Jami Masjid to be the most-probable spot. However, it is doubtful if Cunningham was accurate; his claim of coming across coins of local rulers, from around the site, inscribed with the Sun God, has been rejected by modern scholars.

See also
 Prahladpuri Temple

Notes

References

Hindu temples in Punjab, Pakistan
5th-century BC Hindu temples
Destroyed Hindu temples
Surya temples
Sun
Sun